Sarah Bergman (born 12 August 1993) is a Swedish footballer defender who plays for Mallbackens IF.

Honours 
Sweden U19
Winner
 UEFA Women's Under-19 Championship: 2012

External links 
 

1993 births
Living people
Swedish women's footballers
QBIK players
Mallbackens IF players
Damallsvenskan players
Women's association football defenders
Elitettan players